Fleckenstein may refer to:

 Château de Fleckenstein, an Alsatian castle
 Albrecht Fleckenstein  (1917–1992),  German pharmacologist and physiologist 
 Bill Fleckenstein  (1903–1967) American football player 
 Franz Fleckenstein (1922–1996), German musical artist and priest
 Josef Fleckenstein (1919–2004)  German historian and essayist
 Knut Fleckenstein (born 1953), German politician
 Kurt Fleckenstein (born 1949), German artist
 Sandra Fleckenstein (born 1985), German actress